Bychkovka is a rural locality (a village) in Maloyazovsky Selsoviet, Salavatsky District, Bashkortostan, Russia. The population was 41 as of 2010. There is 1 street.

Geography 
Bychkovka is located 10 km north of Maloyaz (the district's administrative centre) by road. Gusevka is the nearest rural locality.

References 

Rural localities in Salavatsky District